Zhangjiang may refer to several places in China: 

Zhangjiang Town (张江镇), in Pudong, Shanghai
Zhangjiang Hi-Tech Park (张江高科) in Pudong, Shanghai
Zhangjiang Hi-Tech Park station on Shanghai Metro Line 2
Zhangjiang Road station on Shanghai Metro Line 13
Zhangjiang, Taoyuan (漳江镇), a historic town of Taoyuan County, Hunan
Zhangjiang Subdistrict (漳江街道), a subdistrict and the seat of Taoyuan County, Hunan

See also
Zhanjiang, a city in Guangdong, China